Pierre-Joseph Destrebecq (18 June 1881 – 7 December 1945) was a Belgian international football player. He played as striker in Union Saint-Gilloise, Racing Club de Bruxelles and Royal Sporting Club Anderlecht. With the national side, he also played the first official match of the Belgium national team against France on 1 May 1904. The encounter resulted in a 3–3 draw and Destrebecq scored once in this match. He scored 30 goals in 81 first division games.

Palmares

Belgium national team (7 selections, 5 goals scored)
Champion of Belgium (4): in 1904, 1905 and 1906 with Union Saint-Gilloise and in 1908 with Racing Club de Bruxelles

References 

1881 births
1945 deaths
Belgian footballers
Royale Union Saint-Gilloise players
R.S.C. Anderlecht players
Belgium international footballers
Association football forwards
K.F.C. Rhodienne-De Hoek players